Aaron Douglas is an Australian former professional rugby league footballer who played in the 1990s.

He played as a er for the Gold Coast Chargers in 1998.

Playing career
In 1996, Douglas was a member of the Redcliffe Dolphins inaugural Queensland Cup squad. In 1997, he started on the wing in their 18–16 Grand Final win over the Easts Tigers.

In 1998, Douglas joined the Gold Coast Chargers in the National Rugby League. In Round 2 of the 1998 NRL season, he made his NRL debut in a 12–14 loss to the Parramatta Eels. In Round 3, he scored his first try in a 4–18 loss to the Canberra Raiders.

In 1999, after the Chargers folded, Douglas joined the Burleigh Bears in the Queensland Cup. He finished the season as the competition's top try scorer and started on the wing in their 12–10 Grand Final win over Redcliffe. In doing so, he became the first player to win two Queensland Cup premierships. On 16 October 1999, he started on the wing for Burleigh in their 6–10 loss to Great Britain on their tour of Australia.

References

Living people
Australian rugby league players
Rugby league wingers
Gold Coast Chargers players
Redcliffe Dolphins players
Burleigh Bears players
Year of birth missing (living people)